Scoparia mandschurica is a moth in the family Crambidae. It was described by Hugo Theodor Christoph in 1881. It is found in Russia.

References

Moths described in 1881
Scorparia